In Greek mythology, Sicyon is the eponym of the polis of the same name, which was said to have previously been known as Aegiale and, earlier, Mecone.

Family 
Sicyon's father is named variously as Marathon, Metion, Erechtheus or Pelops. He married Zeuxippe, the daughter of Lamedon, the previous king of the polis and region that would come to be named after him. They had a daughter Chthonophyle, who bore two sons: Polybus to Hermes and, later, Androdamas to Phlius, the son of Dionysus. However, in some accounts, Chthnophyle bore Phlius to Dionysus instead.

Mythology 
Sicyon became the 19th king of Sicyonia after he was named as the successor of his father-in-law Lamedon. This was his reward after aiding the latter in his war against, Archander and Architeles, the sons of Achaeus. Sicyon reigned for 45 years and the kingdom was inherited by his son Polybus.

Notes

References 

 Pausanias, Description of Greece with an English Translation by W.H.S. Jones, Litt.D., and H.A. Ormerod, M.A., in 4 Volumes. Cambridge, MA, Harvard University Press; London, William Heinemann Ltd. 1918. Online version at the Perseus Digital Library
 Pausanias, Graeciae Descriptio. 3 vols. Leipzig, Teubner. 1903.  Greek text available at the Perseus Digital Library.
 Stephanus of Byzantium, Stephani Byzantii Ethnicorum quae supersunt, edited by August Meineike (1790-1870), published 1849. A few entries from this important ancient handbook of place names have been translated by Brady Kiesling. Online version at the Topos Text Project.
 Strabo, The Geography of Strabo. Edition by H.L. Jones. Cambridge, Mass.: Harvard University Press; London: William Heinemann, Ltd. 1924. Online version at the Perseus Digital Library.
 Strabo, Geographica edited by A. Meineke. Leipzig: Teubner. 1877. Greek text available at the Perseus Digital Library.
Princes in Greek mythology
Mythological kings of Sicyon
Kings in Greek mythology
Attican characters in Greek mythology
Sicyonian characters in Greek mythology